Parastyrax is a genus of flowering plants belonging to the family Styracaceae.

Its native range is Southern Central China to Myanmar.

Species
Species:

Parastyrax lacei 
Parastyrax macrophyllus

References

Styracaceae
Ericales genera